A Karakul hat, sometimes spelled as Qaraqul hat, also called  Uzbek hat and Jinnah Cap is a hat made from the fur of the Qaraqul breed of sheep. Karakul directly translates to black fur in the Uzbek language and the hat originally comes from Bukhara. The fur from which it is made is referred to as Astrakhan, broadtail, qaraqulcha, or Persian lamb. The hat is peaked, and folds flat when taken off of the wearer's head.

The cap is typically worn by Muslim men in Central and South Asia. It was worn by Amanullah Khan, the former king of Afghanistan, and Muhammad Ali Jinnah, the founding father of Pakistan. The karakul, which had distinguished all educated urban men since the beginning of the 20th century, has fallen out of fashion in Afghanistan and Pakistan.

Production 
The cap is made up of the fur of the Qaraqul or Karakul breed of sheep, which is found in the desert areas of Central Asia. The sheep have been named in connection to the city of Qorako‘l, a town in the Bukhara Region of Uzbekistan. Later, the cap became popular in Mazar Sharif, a city in Afghanistan, after which Uzbek craftsmen also brought the business to Pakistan.

The type of wool from which these caps are made is popularly known as astar, astarkhan, broadtail, qaraqulcha and Irani menda. The literal meaning of Karakul, which is a Turkish word, is black wool.

Design 
In terms of design, the cap is peaked and has several parts. It folds flat when taken off the head. The cap has been particularly popular among the Muslim population of Central and South Asia, however, there is no religious significance attached to it.

The fur is obtained from a newly-born sheep, which gives the cap its tough and curly texture as well as a specific pattern.

Soviet Politburo hat

In the Soviet Union, the karakul hat became very popular among Politburo members. It became common that Soviet leaders appeared in public, wearing this type of hat. The hat probably gained its prestige among Party leaders because it was an obligatory parade attribute of the tsar and Soviet generals. By wearing the karakul hat, Soviet leaders wanted to underline their high political status. In the Soviet Union this hat also took the nickname the pie-hat because it resembled traditional Russian pies.

Karakul worn in Russia, or the Soviet Union, are cylindrical and are unlike the Gandhi cap (which is another type of hat of a different style, color and materials from the karakul) worn in South Asia.

Kashmiri variations 
Karakul caps have been worn by Kashmiris for the past several decades. The Karakul cap is colloquially known as a "Karakuli" in the Kashmir Valley. The traditional headgear of the gentry in Kashmir has historically been the turban tied in a similar fashion to the Pashtun equivalent. 

The Karakul caps are popular amongst most of the mainstream politicians. It is quite common for a Kashmiri groom to wear a Karakul Cap as he waits at his in-laws house for his bride to accompany him home.

African variations 
Karakul caps became popular among Africans and African-Americans in the 1960s. African Presidents such as Modibo Keïta of Mali and Ahmed Sékou Touré of Guinea, who were themselves both of pre-colonial African royal descent, wore the karakul cap to show their independence from European colonial power. The karakul cap is often worn by African and African-American Christians and Jews.

Both the velvet and faux fur versions are worn by men of African descent with Western suits, and African attire such as the grand boubou.  Muslims of African ancestry wear these caps with the dishdasha. In urban slang, the karakul cap is called a fur kufi, while the Rampuri cap is called a velvet fez hat.  When worn properly, these caps are always slanted at an angle, and never placed straight on the head.  Leopard print karakul caps are common in Africa, but are rarely seen in the United States. In popular culture, Eddie Murphy wore the karakul cap in the movie Coming to America.

Gallery

See also

 Astrakhan (fur)
 Astrakhan (hat)
 Canadian military fur wedge cap
 Papakha
 Side cap (Pilotka)
 Taqiyah (cap)

References

 A crowning touch 

Afghan clothing
Hats
Indian clothing
Islamic male clothing
Muhammad Ali Jinnah
Pakistani headgear
Woolen clothing